Concentrated solar power (CSP, also known as concentrating solar power, concentrated solar thermal) systems generate solar power by using mirrors or lenses to concentrate a large area of sunlight into a receiver. Electricity is generated when the concentrated light is converted to heat (solar thermal energy), which drives a heat engine (usually a steam turbine) connected to an electrical power generator or powers a thermochemical reaction.

As of 2021, global installed capacity of concentrated solar power stood at 6.8 GW.

Comparison between CSP and other electricity sources 
As a thermal energy generating power station, CSP has more in common with thermal power stations such as coal, gas, or geothermal. A CSP plant can incorporate thermal energy storage, which stores energy either in the form of sensible heat or as latent heat (for example, using molten salt), which enables these plants to continue to generate electricity whenever it is needed, day or night. This makes CSP a dispatchable form of solar. Dispatchable renewable energy is particularly valuable in places where there is already a high penetration of photovoltaics (PV), such as California, because demand for electric power peaks near sunset just as PV capacity ramps down (a phenomenon referred to as duck curve).

CSP is often compared to photovoltaic solar (PV) since they both use solar energy. While solar PV experienced huge growth in recent years due to falling prices, solar CSP growth has been slow due to technical difficulties and high prices. In 2017, CSP represented less than 2% of worldwide installed capacity of solar electricity plants. 
However, CSP can more easily store energy during the night, making it more competitive with dispatchable generators and baseload plants.

The DEWA project in Dubai, under construction in 2019, held the world record for lowest CSP price in 2017 at US$73 per MWh for its 700 MW combined trough and tower project: 600 MW of trough, 100 MW of tower with 15 hours of thermal energy storage daily.
Base-load CSP tariff in the extremely dry Atacama region of Chile reached below $50/MWh in 2017 auctions.

History 

A legend has it that Archimedes used a "burning glass" to concentrate sunlight on the invading Roman fleet and repel them from Syracuse. The ship caught fire after a few minutes; however, historians continue to doubt the Archimedes story.

In 1866, Auguste Mouchout used a parabolic trough to produce steam for the first solar steam engine. The first patent for a solar collector was obtained by the Italian Alessandro Battaglia in Genoa, Italy, in 1886. Over the following years, invеntors such as John Ericsson and Frank Shuman developed concentrating solar-powered dеvices for irrigation, refrigеration, and locomоtion. In 1913 Shuman finished a  parabolic solar thermal energy station in Maadi, Egypt for irrigation. The first solar-power system using a mirror dish was built by Dr. R.H. Goddard, who was already well known for his research on liquid-fueled rockets and wrote an article in 1929 in which he asserted that all the previous obstacles had been addressed.

Professor Giovanni Francia (1911–1980) designed and built the first concentrated-solar plant, which entered into operation in Sant'Ilario, near Genoa, Italy in 1968. This plant had the architecture of today's power tower plants with a solar receiver in the center of a field of solar collectors. The plant was able to produce 1 MW with superheated steam at 100 bar and 500 °C. The 10 MW Solar One power tower was developed in Southern California in 1981. Solar One was converted into Solar Two in 1995, implementing a new design with a molten salt mixture (60% sodium nitrate, 40% potassium nitrate) as the receiver working fluid and as a storage medium. The molten salt approach proved effective, and Solar Two operated successfully until it was decommissioned in 1999. The parabolic-trough technology of the nearby Solar Energy Generating Systems (SEGS), begun in 1984, was more workable. The 354 MW SEGS was the largest solar power plant in the world, until 2014.

No commercial concentrated solar was constructed from 1990 when SEGS was completed until 2006 when the Compact linear Fresnel reflector system at Liddell Power Station in Australia was built. Few other plants were built with this design although the 5 MW Kimberlina Solar Thermal Energy Plant opened in 2009.

In 2007, 75 MW Nevada Solar One was built, a trough design and the first large plant since SEGS. Between 2009 and 2013, Spain built over 40 parabolic trough systems, standardized in 50 MW blocks.

Due to the success of Solar Two, a commercial power plant, called Solar Tres Power Tower, was built in Spain in 2011, later renamed Gemasolar Thermosolar Plant. Gemasolar's results paved the way for further plants of its type. Ivanpah Solar Power Facility was constructed at the same time but without thermal storage, using natural gas to preheat water each morning.

Most concentrated solar power plants use the parabolic trough design, instead of the power tower or Fresnel systems. There have also been variations of parabolic trough systems like the integrated solar combined cycle (ISCC) which combines troughs and conventional fossil fuel heat systems.

CSP was originally treated as a competitor to photovoltaics, and Ivanpah was built without energy storage, although Solar Two had included several hours of thermal storage. However, increasingly, CSP was being bid with 3 to 12 hours of thermal energy storage, making CSP a dispatchable form of solar energy. As such, it is increasingly seen as competing with natural gas and PV with batteries for flexible, dispatchable power.

Current technology 
CSP is used to produce electricity (sometimes called solar thermoelectricity, usually generated through steam). Concentrated-solar technology systems use mirrors or lenses with tracking systems to focus a large area of sunlight onto a small area. The concentrated light is then used as heat or as a heat source for a conventional power plant (solar thermoelectricity). The solar concentrators used in CSP systems can often also be used to provide industrial process heating or cooling, such as in solar air conditioning.

Concentrating technologies exist in four optical types, namely parabolic trough, dish, concentrating linear Fresnel reflector, and solar power tower. Parabolic trough and concentrating linear Fresnel reflectors are classified as linear focus collector types, while dish and solar tower are point focus types. Linear focus collectors achieve medium concentration factors (50 suns and over), and point focus collectors achieve high concentration factors (over 500 suns). Although simple, these solar concentrators are quite far from the theoretical maximum concentration. Approaching the theoretical maximum may be achieved by using more elaborate concentrators based on nonimaging optics.

Different types of concentrators produce different peak temperatures and correspondingly varying thermodynamic efficiencies, due to differences in the way that they track the sun and focus light. New innovations in CSP technology are leading systems to become more and more cost-effective.

Parabolic trough 

A parabolic trough consists of a linear parabolic reflector that concentrates light onto a receiver positioned along the reflector's focal line. The receiver is a tube positioned at the longitudinal focal line of the parabolic mirror and filled with a working fluid. The reflector follows the sun during the daylight hours by tracking along a single axis. Trough systems are the most developed CSP technology. The Solar Energy Generating Systems (SEGS) plants in California, the world's first commercial parabolic trough plants, Acciona's Nevada Solar One near Boulder City, Nevada, and Andasol, Europe's first commercial parabolic trough plant are representative, along with Plataforma Solar de Almería's SSPS-DCS test facilities in Spain.

Enclosed trough 
The design encapsulates the solar thermal system within a greenhouse-like glasshouse. The glasshouse creates a protected environment to withstand the elements that can negatively impact reliability and efficiency of the solar thermal system. Lightweight curved solar-reflecting mirrors are suspended from the ceiling of the glasshouse by wires. A single-axis tracking system positions the mirrors to retrieve the optimal amount of sunlight. The mirrors concentrate the sunlight and focus it on a network of stationary steel pipes, also suspended from the glasshouse structure. Water is carried throughout the length of the pipe, which is boiled to generate steam when intense solar radiation is applied. Sheltering the mirrors from the wind allows them to achieve higher temperature rates and prevents dust from building up on the mirrors.

GlassPoint Solar, the company that created the Enclosed Trough design, states its technology can produce heat for Enhanced Oil Recovery (EOR) for about $5 per  in sunny regions, compared to between $10 and $12 for other conventional solar thermal technologies.

Solar power tower 

 

A solar power tower consists of an array of dual-axis tracking reflectors (heliostats) that concentrate sunlight on a central receiver atop a tower; the receiver contains a heat-transfer fluid, which can consist of water-steam or molten salt. Optically a solar power tower is the same as a circular Fresnel reflector. The working fluid in the receiver is heated to 500–1000 °C and then used as a heat source for a power generation or energy storage system. An advantage of the solar tower is the reflectors can be adjusted instead of the whole tower. Power-tower development is less advanced than trough systems, but they offer higher efficiency and better energy storage capability. Beam down tower application is also feasible with heliostats to heat the working fluid.

The Solar Two in Daggett, California and the CESA-1 in Plataforma Solar de Almeria Almeria, Spain, are the most representative demonstration plants. The Planta Solar 10 (PS10) in Sanlucar la Mayor, Spain, is the first commercial utility-scale solar power tower in the world. The 377 MW Ivanpah Solar Power Facility, located in the Mojave Desert, is the largest CSP facility in the world, and uses three power towers. Ivanpah generated only 0.652 TWh (63%) of its energy from solar means, and the other 0.388 TWh (37%) was generated by burning natural gas.

Supercritical carbon dioxide can be used instead of steam as heat-transfer fluid for increased electricity production efficiency. However, because of the high temperatures in arid areas where solar power is usually located, it is impossible to cool down carbon dioxide below its critical temperature in the  compressor inlet. Therefore, supercritical carbon dioxide blends with higher critical temperature are currently in development.

Fresnel reflectors 

Fresnel reflectors are made of many thin, flat mirror strips to concentrate sunlight onto tubes through which working fluid is pumped. Flat mirrors allow more reflective surface in the same amount of space than a parabolic reflector, thus capturing more of the available sunlight, and they are much cheaper than parabolic reflectors. Fresnel reflectors can be used in various size CSPs.

Fresnel reflectors are sometimes regarded as a technology with a worse output than other methods. The cost efficiency of this model is what causes some to use this instead of others with higher output ratings. Some new models of Fresnel Reflectors with Ray Tracing capabilities have begun to be tested and have initially proved to yield higher output than the standard version.

Dish Stirling 

A dish Stirling or dish engine system consists of a stand-alone parabolic reflector that concentrates light onto a receiver positioned at the reflector's focal point. The reflector tracks the Sun along two axes. Parabolic-dish systems provide high solar-to-electric efficiency (between 31% and 32%), and their modular nature provides scalability. The Stirling Energy Systems (SES), United Sun Systems (USS) and Science Applications International Corporation (SAIC) dishes at UNLV, and Australian National University's Big Dish in Canberra, Australia are representative of this technology. A world record for solar to electric efficiency was set at 31.25% by SES dishes at the National Solar Thermal Test Facility (NSTTF) in New Mexico on 31 January 2008, a cold, bright day. According to its developer, Ripasso Energy, a Swedish firm, in 2015 its Dish Sterling system being tested in the Kalahari Desert in South Africa showed 34% efficiency. The SES installation in Maricopa, Phoenix was the largest Stirling Dish power installation in the world until it was sold to United Sun Systems. Subsequently, larger parts of the installation have been moved to China as part of the huge energy demand.

Solar thermal enhanced oil recovery 

Heat from the sun can be used to provide steam used to make heavy oil less viscous and easier to pump. Solar power tower and parabolic troughs can be used to provide the steam which is used directly so no generators are required and no electricity is produced. Solar thermal enhanced oil recovery can extend the life of oilfields with very thick oil which would not otherwise be economical to pump.

CSP with thermal energy storage 

In a CSP plant that includes storage, the solar energy is first used to heat the molten salt or synthetic oil which is stored providing thermal/heat energy at high temperature in insulated tanks. Later the hot molten salt (or oil) is used in a steam generator to produce steam to generate electricity by steam turbo generator as per requirement. Thus solar energy which is available in daylight only is used to generate electricity round the clock on demand as a load following power plant or solar peaker plant. The thermal storage capacity is indicated in hours of power generation at nameplate capacity. Unlike solar PV or CSP without storage, the power generation from solar thermal storage plants is dispatchable and self-sustainable similar to coal/gas-fired power plants, but without the pollution. CSP with thermal energy storage plants can also be used as cogeneration plants to supply both electricity and process steam round the clock. As of December 2018, CSP with thermal energy storage plants generation cost have ranged between 5 c € / kWh and 7 c € / kWh depending on good to medium solar radiation received at a location. Unlike solar PV plants, CSP with thermal energy storage plants can also be used economically round the clock to produce only process steam replacing pollution emitting fossil fuels. CSP plant can also be integrated with solar PV for better synergy.

CSP with thermal storage systems are also available using Brayton cycle with air instead of steam for generating electricity and/or steam round the clock. These CSP plants are equipped with gas turbine to generate electricity. These are also small in capacity (<0.4 MW) with flexibility to install in few acres area. Waste heat from the power plant can also be used for process steam generation and HVAC needs. In case land availability is not a limitation, any number of these modules can be installed up to 1000 MW with RAMS and cost advantage since the per MW cost of these units are cheaper than bigger size solar thermal stations.

Centralized district heating round the clock is also feasible with concentrated solar thermal storage plants.

Carbon neutral fuels production
Carbon neutral synthetic fuels production using concentrated solar thermal energy at nearly 1500 °C temperature is feasible technically and viable commercially in near future with declining costs of CSP plants. Also carbon neutral hydrogen can be produced with solar thermal energy (CSP) using Sulfur–iodine cycle, Hybrid sulfur cycle, Iron oxide cycle, Copper–chlorine cycle, Zinc–zinc oxide cycle, Cerium(IV) oxide–cerium(III) oxide cycle, etc.

Deployment around the world 

A early plant operated in Sicily at Adrano.  The US deployment of CSP plants started by 1984 with the SEGS plants. The last SEGS plant was completed in 1990. From 1991 to 2005, no CSP plants were built anywhere in the world. Global installed CSP-capacity increased nearly tenfold between 2004 and 2013 and grew at an average of 50 percent per year during the last five of those years, as the number of countries with installed CSP were growing   In 2013, worldwide installed capacity increased by 36% or nearly 0.9 gigawatt (GW) to more than 3.4 GW. The record for capacity installed was reached in 2014, corresponding to 925 MW, however, was followed by a decline  caused by policy changes, the global financial crisis, and the rapid decrease in price of the photovoltaic cells. Nevertheless, total capacity reached 6800 MW in 2021.

Spain accounted for almost one third of the world's capacity, at 2,300 MW, despite no new capacity entering commercial operation in the country since 2013.
The United States follows with 1,740 MW. Interest is also notable in North Africa and the Middle East, as well as China and India.There is a notable trend towards developing countries and regions with high solar radiation with several large plants under construction in 2017.

The global market was initially dominated by parabolic-trough plants, which accounted for 90% of CSP plants at one point. 
Since about 2010, central power tower CSP has been favored in new plants due to its higher temperature operation – up to  vs. trough's maximum of  – which promises greater efficiency.

Among the larger CSP projects are the Ivanpah Solar Power Facility (392 MW) in the United States, which uses solar power tower technology without thermal energy storage, and the Ouarzazate Solar Power Station in Morocco, which combines trough and tower technologies for a total of 510 MW with several hours of energy storage.

Efficiency 
The efficiency of a concentrating solar power system will depend on the technology used to convert the solar power to electrical energy, the operating temperature of the receiver and the heat rejection, thermal losses in the system, and the presence or absence of other system losses; in addition to the conversion efficiency, the optical system which concentrates the sunlight will also add additional losses.

Real-world systems claim a maximum conversion efficiency of 23-35% for "power tower" type systems, operating at temperatures from 250 to 565 °C, with the higher efficiency number assuming a combined cycle turbine. Dish Stirling systems, operating at temperatures of 550-750 °C, claim an efficiency of about 30%. Due to variation in sun incidence during the day, the average conversion efficiency achieved is not equal to these maximum efficiencies, and the net annual solar-to- electricity efficiencies are 7-20% for pilot power tower systems, and 12-25% for demonstration-scale Stirling dish systems.

Theory
The maximum conversion efficiency of any thermal to electrical energy system is given by the Carnot efficiency, which represents a theoretical limit to the efficiency that can be achieved by any system, set by the laws of thermodynamics. Real-world systems do not achieve the Carnot efficiency.

The conversion efficiency  of the incident solar radiation into mechanical work depends on the thermal radiation properties of the solar receiver and on the heat engine (e.g. steam turbine). 
Solar irradiation is first converted into heat by the solar receiver with the efficiency  and subsequently the heat is converted into mechanical energy by the heat engine with the efficiency , using Carnot's principle. The mechanical energy is then converted into electrical energy by a generator.
For a solar receiver with a mechanical converter (e.g., a turbine), the overall conversion efficiency can be defined as follows:

where  represents the fraction of incident light concentrated onto the receiver,  the fraction of light incident on the receiver that is converted into heat energy,  the efficiency of conversion of heat energy into mechanical energy, and  the efficiency of converting the mechanical energy into electrical power.

 is:

The conversion efficiency  is at most the Carnot efficiency, which is determined by the temperature of the receiver  and the temperature of the heat rejection ("heat sink temperature") ,
 

The real-world efficiencies of typical engines achieve 50% to at most 70% of the Carnot efficiency due to losses such as heat loss and windage in the moving parts.

Ideal case
For a solar flux  (e.g. ) concentrated  times with an efficiency  on the system solar receiver with a collecting area  and an absorptivity :
,
,
For simplicity's sake, one can assume that the losses are only radiative ones (a fair assumption for high temperatures), thus for a reradiating area A and an emissivity  applying the Stefan–Boltzmann law yields:

Simplifying these equations by considering perfect optics ( = 1) and without considering the ultimate conversion step into electricity by a generator, collecting and reradiating areas equal and maximum absorptivity and emissivity ( = 1,  = 1) then substituting in the first equation gives

The graph shows that the overall efficiency does not increase steadily with the receiver's temperature. Although the heat engine's efficiency (Carnot) increases with higher temperature, the receiver's efficiency does not. On the contrary, the receiver's efficiency is decreasing, as the amount of energy it cannot absorb (Qlost) grows by the fourth power as a function of temperature. Hence, there is a maximum reachable temperature. When the receiver efficiency is null (blue curve on the figure below), Tmax is:

There is a temperature Topt for which the efficiency is maximum, i.e.. when the efficiency derivative relative to the receiver temperature is null:

Consequently, this leads us to the following equation:

Solving this equation numerically allows us to obtain the optimum process temperature according to the solar concentration ratio  (red curve on the figure below)

Theoretical efficiencies aside, real-world experience of CSP reveals a 25%–60% shortfall in projected production, a good part of which is due to the practical Carnot cycle losses not included in the above analysis.

Cost and Value 
Bulk power from CSP today is much more expensive than solar PV or Wind power, however when including energy storage CSP can be a cheaper alternative. As early as 2011, the rapid decline of the price of photovoltaic systems lead to projections that CSP will no longer be economically viable. As of 2020, the least expensive utility-scale concentrated solar power stations in the United States and worldwide are five times more expensive than utility-scale photovoltaic power stations, with a projected minimum price of 7 cents per kilowatt-hour for the most advanced CSP stations against record lows of 1.32 cents per kWh for utility-scale PV. This five-fold price difference has been maintained since 2018.

Even though overall deployment of CSP remains limited the levelized cost of power from commercial scale plants has decreased significantly in recent years. With a learning rate estimated at around 20% cost reduction of every doubling in capacity  the cost were approaching the upper end of the fossil fuel cost range at the beginning of the 2020s driven by support schemes in several countries, including Spain, the US, Morocco, South Africa, China, and the UAE:

CSP deployment has slowed down considerably as most of the above-mentioned markets have cancelled their support, as the technology turned out to be more expensive on a per kWH basis than solar PV and wind power. CSP in combination with Thermal Energy Storage (TES) is expected by some to remain cheaper than PV with lithium batteries for storage durations above 4 hours per day, while NREL expects that by 2030 PV with 10-hour storage lithium batteries will cost the same as PV with 4-hour storage used to cost in 2020.

Combining the affordability of PV and the dispatchability of CSP is a prominsing avenue for high capacity factor solar power at low cost. Few PV-CSP plants in China are hoping to operate profitably on the regional coal tariff of US$ 50 per MWh in the year 2021.

Incentives and Markets

Spain 

In 2008 Spain launched the first commercial scale CSP market in Europe. Until 2012, solar-thermal electricity generation was initially eligible for feed-in tariff payments (art. 2 RD 661/2007) - leading to the creation of the largest CSP fleet in the world which at 2.3 GW of installed capacity contributes about 5TWh of power to the Spanish grid every year.
The initial requirements for plants in the FiT were:
 Systems registered in the register of systems prior to 29 September 2008: 50 MW for solar-thermal systems.
 Systems registered after 29 September 2008 (PV only).
The capacity limits for the different system types were re-defined during the review of the application conditions every quarter (art. 5 RD 1578/2008, Annex III RD 1578/2008). Prior to the end of an application period, the market caps specified for each system type are published on the website of the Ministry of Industry, Tourism and Trade (art. 5 RD 1578/2008). Because of cost concerns Spain has halted acceptance of new projects for the feed-in-tariff on 27 January 2012  Already accepted projects were affected by a 6% "solar-tax" on feed-in-tariffs, effectively reducing the feed-in-tariff.

In this context, the Spanish Government enacted the Royal Decree-Law 9/2013  in 2013, aimed at the adoption of urgent measures to guarantee the economic and financial stability of the electric system, laying the foundations of the new Law 24/2013 of the Spanish electricity sector. This new retroactive legal-economic framework applied to all the renewable energy systems was developed in 2014 by the RD 413/2014, which abolished the former regulatory frameworks set by the RD 661/2007 and the RD 1578/2008 and defined a new remuneration scheme for these assets.

After a lost decade for CSP in Europe, Spain announced in its National Energy and Climate Plan the intention of adding 5GW of CSP capacity between 2021 and 2030. Towards this end bi-annual auctions of 200 MW of CSP capacity starting in October 2022 are expected, but details are not yet known.

Australia 

Several CSP dishes have been set up in remote Aboriginal settlements in the Northern Territory: Hermannsburg, Yuendumu and Lajamanu.

So far no commercial scale CSP project has been commissioned in Australia, but several projects were suggested. In 2017 now bankrupt American CSP developer SolarReserve got awarded a PPA to realize the 150MW Aurora Solar Thermal Power Project in South Australia at a record low rate of just AUD$0.08/kWh or close to USD$0.06/kWh. Unfortunately the company failed to secure financing and the project got cancelled. Another promising application for CSP in Australia are mines that need 24/7 electricity but often have no grid connection. Vast Solar a startup company aiming to commercialize a novel modular third generation CSP design  is looking to start construction of a 50MW combines CSP and PV facility in Mt. Isa of North-West Queensland in 2021.

At the federal level, under the Large-scale Renewable Energy Target (LRET), in operation under the Renewable Energy Electricity Act 2000, large-scale solar thermal electricity generation from accredited RET power stations may be entitled to create large-scale generation certificates (LGCs). These certificates can then be sold and transferred to liable entities (usually electricity retailers) to meet their obligations under this tradeable certificates scheme. However, as this legislation is technology neutral in its operation, it tends to favour more established RE technologies with a lower levelised cost of generation, such as large-scale onshore wind, rather than solar thermal and CSP.
At State level, renewable energy feed-in laws typically are capped by maximum generation capacity in kWp, and are open only to micro or medium scale generation and in a number of instances are only open to solar PV (photovoltaic) generation. This means that larger scale CSP projects would not be eligible for payment for feed-in incentives in many of the State and Territory jurisdictions.

China 

Of late China has been aggressive in developing CSP technology to compete with other electricity generation methods based on renewable and non-renewable energy sources. In the current 14th Five-Year Plan CSP projects are developed in several provinces along side large GW sized solar PV and wind projects.

In 2016 China announced its intention to build a batch of 20 technologically diverse CSP demonstration projects in the context of the 13th Five-Year Plan, with the intention of building up an internationally competitive CSP industry. Since the first plants were completed in 2018,  the generated electricity from the plants with thermal storage is supported with an administratively set FiT of RMB 1.5 per kWh. At the end of 2020, China operated a total of 545 MW in 12 CSP plants, seven plants (320 MW) are molten-salt towers; another two plants (150MW) use the proven Eurotrough 150 parabolic trough design, three plants (75 MW) use liner fresnel collectors. Plans to build a second batch of demonstration projects were never enacted and further technology specific support for CSP in the upcoming 14th Five-Year Plan is unknown. Federal support projects from the demonstration batch ran out at the end of 2021.

India
In March 2020, SECI called for 5000 MW tenders which can be combination of Solar PV, Solar thermal with storage and Coal based power (minimum 51% from renewable sources) to supply round the clock power at minimum 80% yearly availability.

Future 
A study done by Greenpeace International, the European Solar Thermal Electricity Association, and the International Energy Agency's SolarPACES group investigated the potential and future of concentrated solar power. The study found that concentrated solar power could account for up to 25% of the world's energy needs by 2050. The increase in investment would be from €2 billion worldwide to €92.5 billion in that time period.
Spain is the leader in concentrated solar power technology, with more than 50 government-approved projects in the works. Also, it exports its technology, further increasing the technology's stake in energy worldwide. Because the technology works best with areas of high insolation (solar radiation), experts predict the biggest growth in places like Africa, Mexico, and the southwest United States. It indicates that the thermal storage systems based in nitrates (calcium, potassium, sodium,...) will make the CSP plants more and more profitable. The study examined three different outcomes for this technology: no increases in CSP technology, investment continuing as it has been in Spain and the US, and finally the true potential of CSP without any barriers on its growth. The findings of the third part are shown in the table below:

Finally, the study acknowledged how technology for CSP was improving and how this would result in a drastic price decrease by 2050. It predicted a drop from the current range of €0.23–0.15/kWh to €0.14–0.10/kWh.

The European Union looked into developing a €400 billion (US$774 billion) network of solar power plants based in the Sahara region using CSP technology to be known as Desertec, to create "a new carbon-free network linking Europe, the Middle East and North Africa". The plan was backed mainly by German industrialists and predicted production of 15% of Europe's power by 2050. Morocco was a major partner in Desertec and as it has barely 1% of the electricity consumption of the EU, it could produce more than enough energy for the entire country with a large energy surplus to deliver to Europe. Algeria has the biggest area of desert, and private Algerian firm Cevital signed up for Desertec. With its wide desert (the highest CSP potential in the Mediterranean and Middle East regions ~ about 170 TWh/year) and its strategic geographical location near Europe, Algeria is one of the key countries to ensure the success of Desertec project. Moreover, with the abundant natural-gas reserve in the Algerian desert, this will strengthen the technical potential of Algeria in acquiring Solar-Gas Hybrid Power Plants for 24-hour electricity generation. Most of the participants pulled out of the effort at the end of 2014.

Experience with first-of-a-kind CSP plants in the USA was mixed. Solana in Arizona, and Ivanpah in California indicate large production shortfalls in electricity generation between 25% and 40% in the first years of operation. Producers blame clouds and stormy weather, but critics seem to think there are technological issues. These problems are causing utilities to pay inflated prices for wholesale electricity, and threaten the long-term viability of the technology. As photovoltaic costs continue to plummet, many think CSP has a limited future in utility-scale electricity production. In other countries especially Spain and South Africa CSP plants have met their designed parameters 

CSP has other uses than electricity. Researchers are investigating solar thermal reactors for the production of solar fuels, making solar a fully transportable form of energy in the future. These researchers use the solar heat of CSP as a catalyst for thermochemistry to break apart molecules of H2O, to create hydrogen (H2) from solar energy with no carbon emissions. By splitting both H2O and CO2, other much-used hydrocarbons – for example, the jet fuel used to fly commercial airplanes – could also be created with solar energy rather than from fossil fuels.

Very large-scale solar power plants 
Around the turn of the millennium up to about 2010, there have been several proposals for gigawatt size, very-large-scale solar power plants using CSP. They include the Euro-Mediterranean Desertec proposal and Project Helios in Greece (10 GW), both now canceled. A 2003 study concluded that the world could generate 2,357,840 TWh each year from very large-scale solar power plants using 1% of each of the world's deserts. Total consumption worldwide was 15,223 TWh/year (in 2003). The gigawatt size projects would have been arrays of standard-sized single plants. In 2012, the BLM made available  of land in the southwestern United States for solar projects, enough for between 10,000 and 20,000 GW. The largest single plant in operation is the 510 MW Noor Solar Power Station. In 2022 the 700 MW CSP 4th phase of the 5GW Mohammed bin Rashid Al Maktoum Solar Park in Dubai will become the largest solar complex featuring CSP.

Suitable sites 
The locations with highest direct irradiance are dry, at high altitude, and located in the tropics. These locations have a higher potential for CSP than areas with less sun.

Abandoned opencast mines, moderate hill slopes and crater depressions may be advantageous in the case of power tower CSP as the power tower can be located on the ground integral with the molten salt storage tank.

Environmental effects 
CSP has a number of environmental effects, particularly on water use, land use and the use of hazardous materials.
Water is generally used for cooling and to clean mirrors. Some projects are looking into various approaches to reduce the water and cleaning agents used, including the use of barriers, non-stick coatings on mirrors, water misting systems, and others.

Water use
Concentrating solar power plants with wet-cooling systems have the highest water-consumption intensities of any conventional type of electric power plant; only fossil-fuel plants with carbon-capture and storage may have higher water intensities. The Solar Energy Industries Association noted that the Nevada Solar One trough CSP plant consumes . The issue of water consumption is heightened because CSP plants are often located in arid environments where water is scarce.

In 2007, the US Congress directed the Department of Energy to report on ways to reduce water consumption by CSP. The subsequent report noted that dry cooling technology was available that, although more expensive to build and operate, could reduce water consumption by CSP by 91 to 95 percent. A hybrid wet/dry cooling system could reduce water consumption by 32 to 58 percent. A 2015 report by NREL noted that of the 24 operating CSP power plants in the US, 4 used dry cooling systems. The four dry-cooled systems were the three power plants at the Ivanpah Solar Power Facility near Barstow, California, and the Genesis Solar Energy Project in Riverside County, California. Of 15 CSP projects under construction or development in the US as of March 2015, 6 were wet systems, 7 were dry systems, 1 hybrid, and 1 unspecified.

Although many older thermoelectric power plants with once-through cooling or cooling ponds use more water than CSP, meaning that more water passes through their systems, most of the cooling water returns to the water body available for other uses, and they consume less water by evaporation. For instance, the median coal power plant in the US with once-through cooling uses , but only  (less than one percent) is lost through evaporation. Since the 1970s, the majority of US power plants have used recirculating systems such as cooling towers rather than once-through systems.

Effects on wildlife 

Insects can be attracted to the bright light caused by concentrated solar technology, and as a result birds that hunt them can be killed by being burned if they fly near the point where light is being focused. This can also affect raptors who hunt the birds. Federal wildlife officials were quoted by opponents as calling the Ivanpah power towers "mega traps" for wildlife.

Some media sources have reported that concentrated solar power plants have injured or killed large numbers of birds due to intense heat from the concentrated sunrays. Some of the claims may have been overstated or exaggerated.

According to rigorous reporting, in over six months, 133 singed birds were counted at Ivanpah. By focusing no more than four mirrors on any one place in the air during standby, at Crescent Dunes Solar Energy Project, in three months, the death rate dropped to zero.

See also 

 Dover Sun House
 Concentrator photovoltaics (CPV)
 Daylighting
 List of solar thermal power stations
 Luminescent solar concentrator
 Salt evaporation pond
 Solar air conditioning
 Solar thermal energy
 Solar thermal collector
 Solar water heating
 Thermal energy storage
 Thermochemical cycle

References

External links 
 Concentrating Solar Power Utility 
 NREL Concentrating Solar Power Program
 Plataforma Solar de Almeria, CSP research center
 ISFOC (Institute of Concentrating Photovoltaic Systems)
 

Solar architecture
Solar power
Solar power stations
French inventions